Alexander Schur (born 23 July 1971) is a former German footballer. Schur  played for more than ten years for Eintracht Frankfurt and is a legend for the Eintracht supporters due to his fighting spirit and his club loyalty.

Arguably his most important goal was the header for the 6–3 against SSV Reutlingen in the 2002–03 season of the Second Bundesliga that assured the promotion of the eagles.

On 22 May 2004 he an Eintracht supporters club, named itself after him, the EFC oldSCHURhand.

After retiring Schur started the 2007–08 season as assistant manager of the Eintracht Frankfurt Under-19 team. In December 2007 he was appointed assistant manager of the reserve squad, Eintracht Frankfurt U23. After the 2008–09 campaign he was appointed under-17 manager of the Eintracht academy.

Honours

Club
Rot-Weiß Frankfurt
 Hessenliga: 1989–90; runner-up 1990–91
 Hesse Cup: 1988–89, 1991–92; runner-up 1993–94

Eintracht Frankfurt
2. Bundesliga: 1997–98
DFB-Pokal: Runner-up 2005–06

External links
  Fan club website
  Alexander Schur at eintracht-archiv.de

1971 births
Living people
Footballers from Frankfurt
German footballers
Rot-Weiss Frankfurt players
FSV Frankfurt players
Eintracht Frankfurt players
Bundesliga players
Association football midfielders